Franz Adolf Syberg (5 July 1904 - 11 December 1955) was a Danish composer.

Life 
Syberg was born in Kerteminde, Funen, to the painters Anna and Fritz Syberg. He moved to Leipzig in 1922 where he studied musical composition and music theory at the Leipzig Conservatory with Sigfrid Karg-Elert and Werner Hübschmann. He left for Copenhagen in 1928, where he studied organ with Peter Thomsen.

He was appointed organist at Kerteminde in 1932, where he remained for the rest of his life. His 1931 Quintet for flute, clarinet and string trio was chosen in 1938 to be performed at the International Society for Contemporary Music in London and the Nordic Music Days in Copenhagen. The years following this saw the composition of his most mature works, ending in 1942, when he stopped composing. His work was largely forgotten until 1990, when seven of his compositions were performed at the Musikhøst festival in Odense. Much of his work has now been published and performed.

His music has much in common with German neo-classicism similar to Hindemith, with much counterpoint and dense linearity, resulting in some harsh and dissonant harmonies. His more mature works show the influence of Carl Nielsen.

Compositions 
Manuscripts are in the Kongelige Bibliotek, Copenhagen
Publisher: Kontrapunkt

Stage 
Uffe hin Spage (marionette play, S. Clausen), 1929
Leonce og Lena (G. Büchner), 1931
Ett drömspel (A. Strindberg), 1941–1942

Orchestral 
Music for oboe and string orchestra, 1933
Sinfonietta, 1934–1935
Adagio for string orchestra, 1938
Symphony, 1939

Chamber 
String Quartet, 1930
Quintet for flute, clarinet, and string trio, 1931
Concertino for oboe and string quintet, 1932
String Trio, 1933
Quartet for oboe and string trio, 1933
Wind Quintet, 1940
Octet for wind instruments, 1941

Organ 
Chaconne, 1933
Prelude, Intermezzo, and Fugato, 1934

Further reading 
N.V. Bentzon: Focus på Syberg, in Dansk musiktidsskrift LVI (1981–1982)
B. Krarup: Franz Syberg: en outsider i dansk mellemkrigsmusik, Dansk musiktidsskrift LXV (1990–1991)

Sources 
Bertel Krarup: 'Syberg, Franz Adolf', Grove Music Online ed. L. Macy (Accessed [Day Month Year of access]), <http://www.grovemusic.com >

1904 births
1955 deaths
20th-century classical composers
Composers for pipe organ
Danish classical composers
Danish male classical composers
People from Kerteminde
University of Music and Theatre Leipzig alumni
20th-century Danish male musicians